The 45th César Awards ceremony, presented by the Académie des Arts et Techniques du Cinéma, took place on 28 February 2020, at the Salle Pleyel in Paris to honour the best French films of 2019. Sandrine Kiberlain presided, and Florence Foresti as the host.

Controversy and protests dogged the Academy in the months running up to the ceremony. The entire board of directors of the César Academy resigned on 13 February 2020, in response to complaints over the opaqueness of the process and the powerlessness of normal Academy members, who do not vote for nor otherwise exercise any control over the leadership of the Academy. The other issue of protest was the 12 nominations received by Roman Polanski's J'Accuse (An Officer and a Spy in English), the most nominations of any eligible film. French feminists protested heaping honors on Polanski, who was convicted of raping a minor in California in 1978 but never served his sentence, and has additionally been accused of other incidents of rape.

Winners and nominees
The nominees for the 45th César Awards were announced on 29 January 2020.

Controversies
Roman Polanski's Best Director win for An Officer and a Spy was poorly received by the audience. Few clapped, and several audience members walked out in disgust, including Best Actress nominee Adèle Haenel.

Polanski as well as other crew members of An Officer and a Spy did not attend the ceremony. No one was there to accept the award on Polanski's behalf.

See also
 25th Lumières Awards
 10th Magritte Awards
 32nd European Film Awards
 92nd Academy Awards
 73rd British Academy Film Awards

References

External links
 Official website

2020
2020 film awards
2020 in French cinema
2020 in Paris
February 2020 events in France